Vexillum castaneostriatum is a species of sea snail, a marine gastropod mollusk, in the family Costellariidae, the ribbed miters.

Description
The length of the shell attains 9 mm.

Distribution
This marine species occurs off the Philippines

References

 Herrmann M. (2012) New species of Vexillum (Pusia) (Gastropoda: Costellariidae) from French Polynesia and the Philippines. Gloria Maris 51(2-3): 45-61

castaneostriatum
Gastropods described in 2012